Gönen is a district of Balıkesir Province of Turkey.

Gönen means "damp soil" in Turkish and may also refer to:

People
 Cenk Gönen (born 1988), Turkish footballer

Places
 Gönen, Gerger, a village in the district of Gerger, Adıyaman Province, Turkey
 Gönen, Isparta, a town and district of Isparta Province, Turkey
 Gönen Dam, Turkey